Meiosimyza rorida is a species of small flies of the family Lauxaniidae.

Distribution
This species is present in most of Europe, in the Near East, and in the Nearctic realm.

Habitat
This species usually lives in the herbous plants of deciduous wet forests and in hedges rows.

Description
These small flies have rounded, yellowish bodies with dark bristles. They show characteristic sternopleural setae and anteroventral comb-like rows of black spinules on the fore femora. The head is yellowish-white, with large reddish compound eyes. The apex of the antennae is brown. The chest is reddish-yellow, with a shiny mesonotum and long bristles. The thorax and the abdomen are jointed by a narrow waist. The legs are yellowish. The wings are transparent and slightly yellow coloured.

Biology
Females lay their eggs in rotting leaves, which the larvae feed on. Adults are active from May to October. They mainly feed on nectar and pollen of Heracleum sphondylium.

Gallery

References

External links
 Tout un monde dans mon jardin

Lauxaniidae
Articles containing video clips
Diptera of Europe
Taxa named by Carl Fredrik Fallén
Insects described in 1820